is a fictional character and major figure in the anime and manga series Bleach created by Tite Kubo. Uryū is introduced in the series as a classmate of the Soul Reaper Ichigo Kurosaki, who reveals himself to be a Quincy, a clan of humans which was destroyed by the Soul Reapers. Wanting to prove the Quincies were better, Uryū challenges Ichigo into defeating Hollows. However, once they are overpowered and start working together, they start getting to know each other, to the point they become friends. Since then, Uryū appears in the series as an ally to Ichigo, accompanying him in every fight he has.

Besides his appearances in the manga and the anime, Uryū has also had minor roles in two animated films from Bleach and has been playable in all of the video games from the series. His character has been well received by readers of Bleach, commonly appearing in the top ten of the characters popularity polls from the manga. Reviewers of manga, anime and other media have commented on Uryū's character, adding praise and criticism. Although he received negative responses in his introduction as an antagonist, Uryū's development as a friend of Ichigo has been praised.

Creation and concept
Along with the Quincies, Uryū was created by Tite Kubo to be the rival of the Soul Reapers, Aizen included. Thus, several of his characteristics including his white outfit to contrast the Soul Reapers' black kimono, and the use of arrows which contrast the Soul Reapers' zanpakuto swords.

In the Japanese anime, Ishida is voiced by Noriaki Sugiyama, His English voice actor is Derek Stephen Prince, who found his character to be "the most complex" he ever made as he saw it as the "black sheep" from the series, noting that it is unknown from which side he tends to be. However, he mentions he sometimes has problems in distinguishing his vocal portrayal from that of the similar character of Shino Aburame from the Naruto''' series. He also liked how his character manages to handle every situation "in a cool way", something that he would like to do.

Appearances

In Bleach

Uryū is a black-haired, bespectacled teenager of average height, generally shy and quiet yet tries harder to act cool around others. Uryū comes from the Ishida family, a family of pure blood Quincies though he is impure like his mother. As a child, having lost his mother at a young age, Uryū mostly interacted and trained with his grandfather Sōken before witnessing him being killed by Hollows right in front of him. This is one of the reasons he hates Soul Reapers as they knew of the attack but did nothing to stop it. As a Quincy, Uryū uses the most common power and ability of the Quincy: a bow named  composed of spiritual energy. During the Arrancar arc, Uryū uses a new Quincy cross, and a variant of his original bow called . Unlike his original bow, it is shaped like a spiderweb and can fire up to 1,200 shots at once.

After Ichigo Kurosaki gains the Soul Reaper powers of Rukia Kuchiki, Uryū confronts him in an attempt to prove that Quincy are superior. Using a special bait, Uryū attracts a swarm of Hollows to Karakura Town, so he and Ichigo can compete to see who can kill the most Hollows in three days. However, this attracts too many Hollows than Uryū expected. During their competition, Uryū learned the reason Ichigo fights, which is the same reason his grandfather fight as a Quincy, leading Uryū to see Ichigo in a new light. He and Ichigo work together to fight a Gillian-type Menos. A few days later, Uryū is defeated by Renji Abarai when he attempts to stop him and Byakuya Kuchiki from capturing Rukia Kuchiki. Intent to save Rukia by joining Ichigo's group, Uryū trains to better equip himself for the next time he needs to battle a Soul Reaper.

Their group is split up soon after their arrival, leaving Uryū with Orihime Inoue. The two attempt to avoid other Soul Reapers, but they are caught by 12th Division captain Mayuri Kurotsuchi, who played an indirect role in Sōken's death and experimented on him after he was sent to the Soul Society. As their battle progresses, Uryū removes his sanrei glove, invoking the Quincy: Letzt Stil. In this form, he unknowingly sacrifices powers to defeat Mayuri. Uryū is later captured by Kaname Tōsen. He is soon reunited with other members of his rescue team that have also been imprisoned, and they are freed by Kenpachi Zaraki. Upon reuniting with Ichigo and saving Rukia, the rescue team returns to the human world. In the anime, during the Bount arc, Uryū used the last of his Quincy powers to defeat the Bount Yoshi.

Back in Karakura Town, Uryū visits his father, Ryūken, who offers to restore his Quincy powers on the condition that Uryū will never work with Soul Reapers again. Uryū agrees and regains his powers, but soon discovers that Orihime has been captured by Aizen. He, Ichigo and Chad arrive to Hueco Mundo to rescue her. Upon meeting Rukia and Renji in Hueco Mundo, their group splits up upon arrival. Uryū defeats Cirucci Sanderwicci, before meeting up with Renji to fight Szayelaporro Grantz. Before being defeated and despite the aid from Nel's Fracciónes, Mayuri indirectly comes to their aid. After his injuries are healed, Uryū holds Yammy at bay, before protecting Orihime from Ulquiorra Shiffer. He tries to stop the Hollowified Ichigo from attacking Ulquiorra, and is attacked himself, but is saved by Ulquiorra, who dies shortly afterwards. He remained with Orihime for the duration of the final battle against Aizen.

Seventeen months after Aizen's defeat and the subsequent loss of Ichigo's Soul Reaper powers, Uryū is ambushed by Kūgo Ginjō. Uryū arrives in time and tells Ichigo not to trust Ginjo. Uryū helps the Soul Reapers defeat Ginjo and other members of Xcution.

The Wandenreich, a group of Quincies take over Hueco Mundo culminating in the advent of the Quincy Blood War. Uryū refuses to aid everyone, while Ichigo goes on a rescue mission. Uryū is recruited by Yhwach at Silbern and the other Sternritters, and learns that he has been named the Wandenreich leader's heir. Ywhach proceeds to bestow Uryū with an 'A' Schrift in a private ceremony, making him a Sternritter while explaining to Uryū that he survived the effects of Auswählen compared to other impure Quincies, due to an unforeseen power within him, thus, convincing Yhwach to appoint him as his successor. Despite learning that Auswählen is the cause of his mother's death, Uryū accompanies Yhwach to the Soul Society for an invasion along with the Sternritters. After Yhwach had absorbed the Soul King and remodeled the entire Soul King Palace, Uryū was assigned to the Schutzstaffel. However, during the climax of the series of battles, Haschwalth having deduced his true intentions to wipe out Wahrwelt itself, Uryū reveals his reasons to Ichigo and his friends for coming to the Soul Society were because he is a Quincy and that only his spiritual pressure can activate the chips that he extracted from the sanrei glove, which he placed around the altered city. When Ichigo, Orihime and Chad leave, Haschwalth attacks Uryū stating that he knows they will be defeated. Uryū is nearly incapacitated, but he recovers and forms a new Heilig Bogen. During the fight, Haschwalth reminds Uryū that although, he assumes that the Almighty can see the future, he states that it possesses a far more terrifying power than he imagined. Uryū demands to know what it is, but Haschwalth promises to tell him after they finish their battle before declaring that it is time for Uryū to place everything upon his broken scales. As the fight continues, Haschwalth releases his Schrift "The Balance" to quickly finish off Uryū. Haschwalth uses his power to cripple Uryū when he attempts to leave with this knowledge, noting the youth's tenacity before preparing to impale him while stating that Uryū is simply a human desperately clinging to his own beliefs. Later in the fight, Uryū manages to dodge Haschwalth's stab at the last minute before noting Haschwalth's comparison of him to his friends. Admitting that he has tried to remain calm and weigh his actions on scales up until this point, Uryū states that he cannot help but follow Ichigo's lead because he will help someone without question, which he notes is true for Orihime, Chad, Renji and Rukia. When Uryū claims that he would feel great joy if he began to resemble any one of them, Haschwalth dismisses his emotions before explaining that he was referring to Uryū's growth. Haschwalth highlights that the single moment where Yhwach granted him power gave him far more growth than all the years he spent with his friends and that it is more logical for him to side with Yhwach because of this. However, Uryū states that he chose to side with them not because it would benefit him, but because they were his friends. Angered by this, Haschwalth notes that Uryū never expected to give up anything in return for being taken in by Yhwach before declaring that Uryū will give Yhwach his life, only to be quickly interrupted when an Auswählen beam envelops him, surprising both him and Uryū. Haschwalth collapses and, upon seeing a concerned Uryū looking at him, claims that he does not feel betrayed by Yhwach, because the latter chose to take his power over Uryū's, which means only he can be an asset to Yhwach. When Uryū ignores him, Haschwalth asks him to return so he can transfer his wounds. Noting that he will die regardless of how wounded he is, Haschwalth reminds Uryū of how he puts everything on his scales because he might come to regret everything if he merely follows others without considering the consequences of his actions before telling him to save his friends. On his way to the Soul Society, Uryū received a special arrow from his father that was made from a special silver cloth inside his mother's body. Uryū uses it to immobilize Yhwach and Ichigo defeats him. Ten years later, Uryū becomes a doctor.

In other media
Uryū has also had minor appearances in two films from Bleach, Bleach: Memories of Nobody and Bleach: The DiamondDust Rebellion. He has also been playable in all of the video games from the series. He has also had his own CD soundtrack as part of the Bleach Beat Collection. His CD contains several tracks performed by his common Japanese voice actor, Noriaki Sugiyama.

Reception
Several pieces of merchandise based on Uryū's appearance have been released, including key chains, plush and necklaces. Ishida has been a popular character since the manga's inception, ranking high in several popularity polls. So far, he has placed third in the first character popularity poll, eighth in the second and fifth in the most recent.
 
Reviewers from anime, manga and other media have commented on Uryū's character, having received mixed responses. When he was first introduced as an antagonist, Mania Entertainment writer Bryan Morton commented that Ishida is "annoying", having found him to be little likeable to the point the viewers would probably hate him. When commenting on his role as an antagonist, Morton added he may be the "most demented" villain he has ever seen. However, when Ishida becomes one of Ichigo's friends, the response was turned around with Morton having stated Ishida had become "a good guy with a chip on his shoulder." He found him to be more likeable although he did not see to be very fun when fighting along with his friends.

When reviewing an episode from the Bounts arc, Jason Van Horn from IGN commented that Ishida was "an impressive character" and wished he had had a more active role in the Soul Society, having liked his actions in this season. Additionally, Carlo Santos from Anime News Network found his character to be very likeable, including his attacks and demeanor, noting him to be a good rearranged version of a stereotypical character. He was also called "the coolest human character" from the series by Santos as he praised his new weapons shown in his fight against the arrancar while focusing on their appearance.

Nik Freeman of Anime News Network tried to summarize why Bleach''s popularity declined between 2005 and 2015 from one of the most popular shonen series to "a shell of its former self that subsists on the memory of its glory days." Freeman noted Ishida's "dramatic potential" due to his allegiance change while lamented Kubo's low-usage of his character in the Thousand-Year Blood War arc.

See also

 List of Bleach characters

References

Anime and manga characters who can move at superhuman speeds
Bleach characters
Comics characters introduced in 2002
Fictional characters with energy-manipulation abilities
Fictional demon hunters
Fictional exorcists
Fictional high school students
Fictional kyūjutsuka
Fictional monster hunters
Fictional soldiers
Male characters in anime and manga
Teenage characters in anime and manga